The Ushuaia Loppet is a cross-country skiing marathon in Argentina. It has been held since 1986.

See also 
 Marchablanca

References

External links
Official website  (Spanish)

1986 establishments in Argentina
August sporting events
Recurring sporting events established in 1986
Ski marathons
Skiing in Argentina
Ushuaia